Ana M. Briongos (born 1946 in Barcelona, Spain), also known as Ana Briongos or Ana María Briongos.

She finished a five-year degree in physics at the University of Barcelona. Later she studied Persian at the University of Tehran during the time of the Shah, and worked in Iran and Afghanistan.

She came back to Spain and for ten years she was the director of Interway an Organisation for International Student Exchange. After the Iranian Revolution she became acquainted with post-revolutionary Iran from Isfahan, where she worked in a carpet store in the city's bazaar while she was writing her third book. She then went to India and lived in Calcutta for several years.

Briongos felt the need to tell what she had seen, lived, and felt in these countries. As a result, she wrote six books in Spanish and Catalan, which have been translated into several languages, all of them explaining daily life and the experiences of everyday people, with the idea that information should not remain only in the hands of television cameras, journalists, and anthropologists.

Nowadays she gives lectures and conferences in universities and social organisations.

Her book Winter in Kandahar: Life in Afghanistan Before the Taliban won the 2009 Annual Latino Book Award for best travel book. Another of her books, Black on black: Iran revisited, was shortlisted for the Thomas Cook/Daily Telegraph Travel Book Award in 2001, and was one of the final six contenders. and
 
In 2009, she won the Gourmand Award 2009 in two categories for the book Iran, receptes i costums gastronómics, written in Catalan, with Quico Alsina as co-author.

From 2013 to 2015 she was a member of the board of Sociedad Geográfica Española.

Tony Wheeler, co-founder of Lonely Planet, likes to cite, or reference, a paragraph from Black on Black, Iran revisited by Ana Briongos why young people should travel.

In october, 2020 she was the presenter of the program 'Va passar aquí' on the History and curiosities of the city of Barcelona, a television channel Betevé on 'La casa dels hippies, un edificio singular' built in Barcelona in 1970 by the architects Lluís Clotet and Òscar Tusquets, inhabited by artists and liberal people who made the building a symbol of Barcelona's counterculture.

Bibliography 
Winter in Kandahar: Life in Afghanistan Before the Taliban
Black on Black: Iran Revisited
La caverna di Alì Babà. L'Iran giorno per giorno
Iran W jaskini Ali Baby
A caverna de Ali-Babá
Mijn leven in Iran - De bazaar van Isfahan
Der grot van Alí Baba - Een lente in Isfahan
L'enigma de la Pe Pi
¡Esto es Calcuta!
Iran Receptes i costums gastronòmics
Geografías íntimas

References

External links 
 Ana M. Briongos website
 Irán recetas y habitos gastronomicos - book in PDF

21st-century travel writers
Spanish travel writers
1946 births
Living people